Grünberg, Gruenberg is a German surname meaning "green mountain". Variants include Grunberg and in Norwegian Grønnberg.

Notable people with the surname include:

Grünberg
Alfred Grünberg (1902–1942), Communist member of the resistance against the Nazis
Carl Grünberg (1861–1940), founder of the Archiv für die Geschichte des Sozialismus und der Arbeiterbewegung (Archive for the history of socialism and workers movement) (1911–1930)
Grethe Grünberg (born 1988), ice dancer
Hans-Ulrich Grünberg (born 1956), German chess master
Karl Grünberg (died 1921), German entomologist
Klaus Grünberg (born 1941), German actor
Martin Grünberg (1655–1706), architect
Peter Grünberg (1939–2018), German physicist and Nobel Prize winner
Rosa Grünberg (1878–1960), Swedish actress and soprano 
Sven Grünberg (born 1956), Estonian ambient and progressive rock composer
Theodor Koch-Grünberg (1872–1924), ethnologist

Grunberg
Arnon Grunberg (born 1971), Dutch writer
Greg Grunberg (born 1966), American television actor
Marianne Grunberg-Manago (1921–2013), French biochemist

Gruenberg
Elliott Gruenberg (born 1990), American guitarist and lead guitarist for Blessthefall
Erich Gruenberg (1924–2020), British violinist
Jean Gruenberg (born 1950), Swiss biologist
Karl Walter Gruenberg (1928–2007), British mathematician
Louis Gruenberg (1884–1964), composer    
Martin J. Gruenberg (born 1953), 20th Chairperson of the Federal Deposit Insurance Corporation
Max Gruenberg (1943–2016), American politician

German-language surnames
German toponymic surnames
Jewish surnames
Surnames from ornamental names